Yoav Cohen (born 30 August 1999) is an Israeli windsurfer. In 2020 he won the RS:X European Championships, and In 2021 he represented Israel at the 2020 Summer Olympics and finished 4th in Men's RS:X.

Biography
His parents are Hananel and Isabel.  Cohen was born in Ganei Yehuda, Israel, where until he was two years old his family lived in a trailer. He and his family then lived in kibbutz Kadima, and then in Caesarea, Israel.

His sailing club is Sdot Yam Sailing Club.

In 2013, at age 13, Cohen won the Techno 293 Under 15 World Championships in Sopot, Poland.

Cohen was the 2017 youth world champion, after winning the 47th Youth Sailing World Championships in Sanya, China.

He won the 2018 Medemblik Regatta (formerly Delta Lloyd Regatta) in Medemblik, the Netherlands.

Cohen won the gold medal at the 2020 RS:X European Championships in Vilamoura, Portugal.

He finished 5th at the 2021 RS:X World Championships in Cadiz, Spain.

In 2021, Cohen represented Israel at the 2020 Summer Olympics and finished 4th in Men's RS:X event.

See also
List of World Championships medalists in sailing (windsurfer classes)
List of World Championships medalists in sailing (juniors and youth classes)
List of European Championships medalists in sailing
List of Jews in sports

References

External links
 
 
 
 
 

Living people
1999 births
Israeli windsurfers
Israeli people of Jewish descent
Sailors at the 2020 Summer Olympics – RS:X
Israeli male sailors (sport)